Tivenys is a municipality in the comarca of the Baix Ebre in Tarragona province Catalonia, Spain. It is situated on the left bank of the Ebro river among the mountains of the Cardó-Boix Massif.

Notable people 
 José Alcoverro (1835-1908), sculptor.

References

External links 
 Official website 
 Government data pages 

Municipalities in Baix Ebre
Populated places in Baix Ebre